Pembina may refer to:

Canada

Alberta
Pembina (Alberta electoral district), a former federal electoral district
Pembina (Edmonton), a neighbourhood in Edmonton
Pembina Institute, an environmental research group
Pembina oil field, an oil- and gas-producing region in central Alberta
Pembina Pipeline, a pipeline company
Pembina River (Alberta), a river in central Alberta
Pembina River Provincial Park

Manitoba
 Municipality of Pembina, a municipality in southern Manitoba
 Rural Municipality of Pembina, a former municipality
 Pembina (provincial electoral district), a former provincial electoral district
 North Pembina, original name for West Lynne, Manitoba
 Pembina Trails School Division, Winnipeg Metro Region
 Pembina Valley Region
 Pembina Valley Provincial Park
 Winnipeg Route 42, commonly known as Pembina Highway

United States
 Pembina County, Minnesota, a historical county in Minnesota Territory
 Pembina, Missouri an unincorporated community in Christian County
 Pembina County, North Dakota
 Pembina, North Dakota, a city in Pembina County
 Pembina Region, a historical unorganized territory now part of North and South Dakota
 Pembina Township, Mahnomen County, Minnesota

Canada and the United States
Pembina Band of Chippewa Indians, a historical tribe that lived along upper Red River of the North and its tributaries
Pembina-Emerson Border Crossing in North Dakota and Manitoba
Pembina Escarpment in North Dakota and Manitoba
Pembina River (Manitoba – North Dakota)

See also
Pembina Hills (disambiguation)